Lampo was one of four s built for the  (Royal Italian Navy) in the early 1930s. Completed in 1932, she served in World War II.

Design and description
The Folgore-class destroyers were essentially copies of the preceding , although their beam was reduced in an unsuccessful attempt to improve their speed over that achieved by the earlier ships. Their complement during wartime was 185 officers and enlisted men.

The Folgores were powered by two Belluzzo geared steam turbines, each driving one propeller shaft using steam supplied by three Thornycroft boilers.

Their main battery consisted of four  guns in two twin-gun turrets, one each fore and aft of the superstructure. Anti-aircraft (AA) defense for the Folgore-class ships was provided by a pair of  AA guns in single mounts amidships and a pair of twin-gun mounts for  machine guns. They were equipped with six  torpedo tubes in two triple mounts amidships. Although the ships were not provided with a sonar system for anti-submarine work, they were fitted with a pair of depth charge throwers. The Folgores could carry 52 mines.

Construction and career
Lampo was laid down by Officine & Cantieri Partenopei at their Naples shipyard on 30 January 1930, launched on 26 July 1931 and commissioned on 13 August 1932.

Citations

Bibliography

External links
 Lampo (1931) Marina Militare website

Folgore-class destroyers
World War II destroyers of Italy
1931 ships
Maritime incidents in April 1943
World War II shipwrecks in the Mediterranean Sea
Ships built in Naples